Rapolas Šaltenis (1908 near Utena, Lithuania – 2007) was a journalist, author, translator, and teacher.

He published his first book, a memoir entitled Aš - mokytojas (I - A Teacher) at the age of 74. He was a recipient of the Order of the Lithuanian Grand Duke Gediminas, Class V.

References

1908 births
2007 deaths
Lithuanian translators
Lithuanian journalists
Recipients of the Order of the Lithuanian Grand Duke Gediminas
20th-century translators
20th-century journalists